Nigel James Brooks  (born 1936) is an English composer, arranger and conductor. He was born in Barnstaple and spent most of his childhood in Ilfracombe, North Devon. He attended Guildhall School of Music and Drama in London. For much of his career he was an orchestral arranger, particularly for the BBC and also conducted the BBC Concert Orchestra. He formed his own musical ensemble "The Nigel Brooks Singers" which appeared on Friday Night is Music Night and earned three gold discs, and two silver.

He has written three ballets for Sadler's Wells (Barnstaple Fair, Seven Cameos for Combe and The Water Babies), and an opera based on Daphne du Maurier's novel Jamaica Inn. He was married to Jean, whose death was commemorated by his adagio for strings To My Love.

Brooks was awarded the British Empire Medal (BEM) in the 2022 Birthday Honours for services to musical theatre and the music industry.

References

1936 births
Musicians from Barnstaple
English composers
English conductors (music)
British male conductors (music)
Living people
21st-century British conductors (music)
21st-century British male musicians
Recipients of the British Empire Medal